General transcription factor IIH subunit 4 is a protein that in humans is encoded by the GTF2H4 gene.

Interactions 

GTF2H4 has been shown to interact with:
 GTF2F1, 
 MED21, 
 POLR2A, 
 TATA binding protein, 
 Transcription Factor II B, and
 XPB.

See also 
 Transcription Factor II H

References

Further reading

External links 
 

Transcription factors